Jullye Kayherine Giliberti Cevedo (born April 23, 1976 in Caracas, Venezuela) is a  Venezuelan actress best known for her roles in telenovelas.  She has appeared in several series, including La Ley del silencio, Amores de mercado and Prisionera. She plays the lovesick Julia Arismendi in Telemundo's Dame Chocolate.

Giliberti is signed to play one of the four title roles in Telemundo's upcoming Las Brujas de South Beach.

Telenovelas
(2011) Amar de Nuevo...Rosilda
(2009) Si me miran tus ojos
(2007) Dame Chocolate...Julia Arismendi
(2006) Amores de mercado...Cristina Moreno
(2005) La ley del silencio...Magdalena Aguirre
(2004) Prisionera...Ignacia 'Nacha' Vergara

Personal life
She has been married once. She has been dating the Mexican journalista Fernando del Rincón since 2011 and in 2014 he expressed plans to  marry her. April 19, 2014 they got married and has been living happily in Miami along their two dogs.

External links

Jullye Giliberti on Twitter

Venezuelan television actresses
Venezuelan telenovela actresses
1976 births
Living people
Actresses from Caracas